The OKO-7 was to have been a heavy fighter produced in the Ukraine region of the USSR in 1940

Designed to a 1940 VVS requirement for a heavy fighter, the OKO-7 was to have been powered by two I,500hp Shvetsov M-90 (Ash-90) or two 1,380hp Mikulin AM-37 engines, with armament of three 20mm ShVAK cannon and two 7.62mm ShKAS machine-guns. The OKO-7 was Tairov's last known design before he was killed in an air crash in December 1941.

Specifications (OKO-7)

See also

References

 Gunston, Bill. “The Osprey Encyclopaedia of Russian Aircraft 1875 – 1995”. London, Osprey. 1995.

External links

 https://web.archive.org/web/20070703081400/http://www.aviation.ru/Bartini/

1940s Soviet fighter aircraft
Aircraft manufactured in the Soviet Union
Abandoned military aircraft projects of the Soviet Union